The tufted apple bud moth (Platynota idaeusalis) is a moth of the family Tortricidae. It is found in eastern North America, from Ontario, south to Florida, west to Oklahoma.

The wingspan is 12–25 mm. Adults are on wing from June to July in the north. There are multiple generations per year.

The larvae feed on the leaves of various plants, including apple, ash, walnut, boxelder, clover, goldenrod, pine and willow. It is considered one of the most serious direct pests of apples in the mid-Atlantic region of North America.

References

External links
Bug Guide
Detailed description

Agricultural pest insects
Platynota (moth)